Vaivre may refer to the following places in France:

Grange-de-Vaivre, a commune in the Jura department in eastern France
La Basse-Vaivre, a commune in the Haute-Saône department in eastern France
La Vaivre, a commune in the Haute-Saône department in eastern France
Lac de Vaivre, an artificial lake in Vesoul, in Haute-Saône, France
Rémondans-Vaivre, a commune in the Doubs department in eastern France
Vaivre-et-Montoille, a commune in the Haute-Saône department in eastern France